The Ghost of Each Room (stylized as tHe gHost oF eAch room) is the second solo album by cEvin Key released in 2001.

Track listing 

All tracks by cEvin Key.

 "Bobs Shadow" – 4:59
 "Tatayama" – 5:52
 "Horopter" – 6:01
 "15th Shade" – 3:42
 "Sklang" – 3:10
 "Frozen Sky" – 3:52
 "Aphasia" – 5:13
 "Klora" – 3:32
 "cccc4" – 5:44
 "A Certain Stuuckey" – 9:02

Personnel
 cEvin Key - keyboards, synthesizers, drums, bass guitar, guitar, theremin
 Kenichi Tokoi - Vocals and saxophone on track 2
 Edward Ka-Spel - Vocals on 4 and 10
 Nivek Ogre - Vocals on 6
 Saki Kaskas - Guitar and ebow on track 6

Credits
 Artwork and cover photography by cEvin Key
 Engineering and mixing by Frankie "Pet" Verschuuren and cEvin Key
 Mastered by Rick Essig
 Photography by Bree Thompson
 Photography assembled by Chaos Grafix
 Produced by cEvin Key

Notes
Recorded at Subconscious Studios. Hollywood, California. Studio Klaverland. Nijmegen, the Netherlands. Digital I/O, Los Angeles and on location in Negril Jamaica.

Mastered at Master Cutting Room, NYC

Cover photo is an extract from a painting hanging in the very haunted Rose Hall, Jamaica.

"Tatayama" is actually a remix cEvin Key has made for the Sonic Adventure Remix compilation.

Dedicated to Al Nelson.

External links
The Ghost of Each Room at Discogs.com

2001 albums
CEvin Key albums